Gamers Outreach Foundation (stylized as Gamers Outreach) is a 501(c)(3) nonprofit organization that provides entertainment to hospitalized families through video games. The organization was started in 2007 in response to a canceled Halo tournament. Present-day, Gamers Outreach oversees devices and services to help hospitals manage video game content. The organization works to help families cope with treatment inside hospitals while reinforcing healthcare staff. According to its website, Gamers Outreach programs enable as many as 3 million gaming experiences each year for patients across hundreds of healthcare facilities.

History 

In March 2007, more than three hundred individuals had registered to participate in a Halo 2 tournament organized by Saline High School student Zach Wigal. Wigal, along with a group of friends, had rented his high school's cafeteria to facilitate the event, and spent months organizing one of the area's first ever competitive video game tournaments.

Three days before the event was scheduled to take place, protest from a local public safety official forced the tournament’s cancellation. According to a voicemail left for the school district’s superintendent, it was the opinion of the public safety officer that content in games like Halo was “corrupting the minds of America’s youth.” He deemed the gaming tournament a “hazard to the public safety of the community” due to content in Halo, concerned kids were “training themselves to kill” playing video games.

Still determined to host a tournament, Wigal and his friends began organizing a new event to illustrate the positive impact gamers can make when they come together to play video games. In 2008, Gamers for Giving was born, a competitive gaming tournament and LAN party that provided gamers with an opportunity to participate in gaming activities, while simultaneously raising money for charity.

In the process of planning the new tournament, Gamers Outreach Foundation was established. While the original purpose of the organization was to facilitate Gamers for Giving, the newly founded 501(c)(3) nonprofit began taking on a life of its own.

As interest in Gamers for Giving grew, so did the scope of Gamers Outreach's mission. In 2009, Gamers Outreach began working with C.S. Mott Children's Hospital of Ann Arbor, Michigan, to provide video games to hospitalized children. Witnessing the frequent need for bedside activities, as well as the impact games were making in the medical environment, it was quickly realized Gamers Outreach could provide something more specific: accessible recreation for kids during long-term stays.

After spending six months volunteering within the hospital, the first "GO Kart" was created – a portable, medical-grade video game kiosk that provided health workers with a way to transport games and entertainment to children who were unable to leave their rooms.

Gamers Outreach has since grown into an organization dedicated to providing hospitalized families with access to play. The organization's programs serve children in hospitals, primarily around the United States. Through Gamers Outreach, gamers or interested donors can directly help young people in hospitals of their choosing.

Mission statement 
The mission statement of Gamers Outreach Foundation is as follows:

Gamers Outreach is a for-purpose organization helping to restore a sense of joy and normalcy in the lives of hospitalized children. We believe the world is better when kids can play, and gamers have the power to help.

Programs 

Project GO Kart

Gamers Outreach constructs portable, medical-grade video game kiosks called "GO Karts" (Gamers Outreach Karts). These kiosks enable health staff to easily provide bedside activities to children unable to leave their rooms in hospitals. Each GO Kart is equipped with a gaming console, monitor, and assortment of games. The carts provide a safe and efficient way to ensure kids have access to entertainment and coping mechanisms during hospitalization. Each unit also has an internal lift mechanism, which allows healthcare staff to adjust the GO Kart to a patient's bedside, accommodating a variety of medical scenarios which may limit a patient's mobility.

Player 2

Player 2 is a volunteer program where gamers have the opportunity to apply the knowledge they have acquired through gaming in a manner that supports patients and staff within hospitals. By volunteering, gamers become "digital activity managers" and serve by managing equipment, providing tech support, and playing games with patients. Many hospitals receive game donations, but without proper staffing to manage inventory at a mass scale, it can become difficult for tech donations to properly serve patients as intended. Player 2 helps address this issue by ensuring knowledgeable individuals are present to distribute technology and exercise its positive benefits.

Save Point

Introduced in 2021, Save Point is a program which places high-tech vending machines inside select hospitals. Each machine acts as a distribution hub that provides toys, gaming codes, and fun swag items to kids and families. As kids visit a hospital and progress through treatment, hospital staff can grant access to a Save Point and allow kids access to take-home experiences.

Portal

Announced during Gamers for Giving 2021, Portal is a software platform for hospitals to manage video game content across hundreds of patient rooms.

Gamers for Giving 

Each year, the foundation hosts a LAN party/streaming marathon called Gamers for Giving. Since its inception in 2008, it's become one of the largest LAN events in North America. The event helps raise money in support of Gamers Outreach programs. The event typically features video game tournaments, video game industry guests, and a variety of activities/competitions for participants.

References

External links 
 Gamers Outreach Foundation Official website
 "Gamers for Giving Website"

Video game organizations
Video game culture
Charities based in Michigan
501(c)(3) organizations